The MIDAS Trial is a randomized controlled trial in Manchester, England using Motivational Interventions for Drugs & Alcohol misuse in Schizophrenia. It is led by Professor Christine Barrowclough and operates in both Manchester and London.

The trial is, along with the Danish CapOpus trial, among the only trials aimed at this particular group of comorbid substance abusers with schizophrenia.

Clinical trials
Psychology experiments